The 1923 Delaware Fightin' Blue Hens football team was an American football team that represented the University of Delaware in the 1923 college football season. In its second season under head coach William McAvoy, the team compiled a 5–3–1 record and outscored opponents by a total of 76 to 45.

Schedule

References

Delaware
Delaware Fightin' Blue Hens football seasons
Delaware Fightin' Blue Hens football